Agrotis sardzeana is a moth of the family Noctuidae. It is found in the eremic zone from North Africa to the Arabian Peninsula to Pakistan and India.

Adults are on wing from October to December. There is one generation per year.

External links
 Noctuinae of Israel

Agrotis
Insects of Cape Verde
Insects of Chad
Insects of West Africa
Moths of the Middle East
Moths described in 1941
Moths of Africa